Caligula boisduvali is a moth of the family Saturniidae. It was described by Eduard Friedrich Eversmann in 1846. It is found in the Russian Far East and Japan.

Adults are on wing from August to September.

The larvae feed on the leaves of various plants, including Salix, Hippophae, Betula and Filipendula ulmaria.

External links
Species info

Caligula (moth)
Moths described in 1846
Moths of Japan
Moths of Asia
Taxa named by Eduard Friedrich Eversmann